Paul M. Grist State Park is a public recreation area located  north of Selma operated by the government of Dallas County, Alabama. The park offers water activities on a  lake as well as facilities for camping and picnicking.

History
The park was developed by workers in the Civilian Conservation Corps who built roads, trails, and the lake dam in the 1930s. It was first called Valley Creek State Park before being renamed for YMCA director and community leader Paul Malone Grist.

In 2015, the park was one of several state parks that were closed or saw curtailment of services following budget cuts. After a two-month hiatus, it reopened when an agreement was reached allowing Dallas County to lease the park from the state for 15 years at a cost of ten dollars.

Activities and amenities
Fishing: The park's  lake is stocked with bass, bluegill, redear sunfish and catfish. Only electric trolling motors are permitted. Boat rentals are offered and a boat launch is available for privately owned craft.
Camping: The park's campground has 11 modern sites with hookups for RVs as well as primitive campsites.
Day-use area: The park has picnic tables, a large picnic pavilion, a swimming beach, paddle boat rentals, playing fields, and shoreline fishing.

References

External links
Paul M. Grist State Park Alabama Department of Conservation and Natural Resources
Paul M. Grist State Park Map Alabama Department of Conservation and Natural Resources

State parks of Alabama
Protected areas of Dallas County, Alabama
Civilian Conservation Corps in Alabama